925 is the debut studio album by English indie band Sorry. It was released on 27 March 2020 under Domino Recording Company.

Critical reception

925 was met with generally favorable reviews from critics. At Metacritic, which assigns a weighted average rating out of 100 to reviews from mainstream publications, this release received an average score of 79, based on 15 reviews.

Accolades

Track listing

Charts

Release history

References

2020 debut albums
Sorry (band) albums
Domino Recording Company albums